Hymenobacter xinjiangensis  is a radiation-resistant,  Gram-negative, rod-shaped and non-motile bacterium from the genus of Hymenobacter which has been isolated from sand from the desert of Xinjiang in China.

References

External links
Type strain of Hymenobacter xinjiangensis at BacDive -  the Bacterial Diversity Metadatabase

xinjiangensis
Bacteria described in 2007